Hanumappa Muniappa Reddy (12 June 1892 – 14 January 1960), known as H. M. Reddy, was an Indian film director and producer, known for his works in Telugu cinema. He directed the first Indian multilingual sound film Kalidas (1931), shot in Telugu and Tamil. He then produced and directed the first full length Telugu sound film, Bhakta Prahlada in 1932.

Early career
Reddy produced and directed India's first multilingual (Telugu-Tamil) talkie, Bhakta Kalidasa in 1931.

Born on 12 June 1892, H. M. Reddy's full name was Hanumappa Muniappa Reddy. He studied in Bangalore where he worked as a police inspector. Later he left the job as he was not interested to work for the British. With an interest in the field of cinema, he moved to Mumbai to research on Telugu movies where he also worked as reflector boy in a studio.

H. M. Reddy had started Rohini Pictures Limited at Madras with the partnership of B. N. Reddy and actress Kannamba. The first film released from this banner was Gruha Lakshmi that was based on the play of "Rangoon Rowdy".

H. M. Reddy died on 14 Jan 1960, during the making of Gaja Donga.

Producer
 Bhakta Prahlada (1932)
 Gruhalakshmi (1938)
 Tenali Ramakrishna (1941)
 Pratigna (1953)
 Vaddante Dabbu (1954) (presenter)

Director
 Prince Vijay Kumar (1930)
 Kalidas (1931)
 Bar Ke Pobar (1931)
 Bhakta Prahlada (1932)
 Jazz of Life (1932)
 Sita Swayamvar (1933)
 Gruhalakshmi (1938)
 Matru Bhoomi (1939)
 Chaduvukunna Bharya (1940)
 Bondam Pelli (1940)
 Barrister Parvateesam (1940)
 Tenali Ramakrishna (1941)
 Gharana Donga (1942)
 Sati Seeta (1946)
 Nirdoshi (1951)
 Niraparadhi (1951)
 Pratigna (1953)

See also
 Raghupathi Venkaiah Naidu

References

External links
 

1892 births
1960 deaths
20th-century Indian film directors
Telugu film directors
Film directors from Andhra Pradesh
Film producers from Andhra Pradesh
Telugu film producers